Coast Guard Station, Two Lights, Maine is a 1927 oil painting by the American Realist artist Edward Hopper. The work depicts the Cape Elizabeth Lights, a frequent subject of Hopper and wife's frequent summer visits to Cape Elizabeth, Maine.

See also
 List of works by Edward Hopper

References

Paintings by Edward Hopper
1927 paintings
Paintings in the collection of the Metropolitan Museum of Art